Aart is a Dutch short form of the given name Arnout (English Arnold).  Notable people with the name include:

 Aart Alblas (1918–1944), Dutch navy officer, resistance member
 Aart van Antum (1580–1620), Dutch marine painter
 Aart van Asperen (born 1956), Dutch television director
 Aart den Boer (1852–1941), Dutch architect and contractor
 Aart Brederode (1942–2020), Dutch field hockey player
 Aart van Dobbenburgh (1899–1988), Dutch graphic artist
 Aart Jansz Druyvesteyn (1577–1627),  Dutch lawyer, painter, and mayor of Haarlem
 Aart de Geus (born 1954), Dutch-born American computer businessman
 Aart Jan de Geus (born 1955), Dutch politician and chairman of the Bertelsmann Foundation
 Aart van den IJssel (1922–1983), Dutch sculptor, painter and draftsman
 Aart Klein (1909–2001), Dutch photographer
 Aart Koopmans (1946–2007), Dutch businessman
 Aart van der Leeuw (1876–1931), Dutch writer
 Aart Malherbe (born c. 1930), South African Vice Admiral
 Aart Schouman (1710–1792), Dutch painter
 Aart Staartjes (1938–2020), Dutch actor, director, television presenter and documentary maker, "Mr. Aart" in the Dutch Sesame Street program
 Aart Vierhouten (born 1970), Dutch racing cyclist
 Aart van Wilgenburg (1902–1955), Dutch swimmer

References

Dutch masculine given names